The 1990 Thriftway ATP Championship, also known as the Cincinnati Open, was a tennis tournament played on outdoor hard courts. It was the 89st edition of the tournament and was part of the ATP Super 9 of the 1990 ATP Tour. It took place in Mason, Ohio, United States from August 6 through August 12, 1990.

The tournament had previously appeared on the Tier III Series of the WTA Tour but no event was held from 1989 to 2003.

The singles field was headlined by World No. 1, Wimbledon champion, Tokyo outdoor, Los Angeles, Indian Wells Masters title holder and Australian Open runner-up, 1987 Cincinnati winner Stefan Edberg, San Francisco, Washington, Key Biscayne winner, French Open finalist Andre Agassi and Barcelona, Madrid winner, French Open losing finalist Andrés Gómez. Other top seeds were Rotterdam, Orlando titlist Brad Gilbert, Tokyo outdoor finalist Aaron Krickstein, Jay Berger, Michael Chang and John McEnroe.

Champions

Singles

 Stefan Edberg defeated  Brad Gilbert 6–1, 6–1 
It was Stefan Edberg's 5th title of the year and his 26th overall. It was his 2nd Masters title of the year and overall.

Doubles

 Darren Cahill /  Mark Kratzmann defeated  Neil Broad /  Gary Muller 7–6, 6–2.

References

External links
 
 ITF tournament edition profile
 ATP tournament profile

 
Cincinnati Masters
Thriftway ATP Championships
Thriftway ATP Championships
Thriftway ATP Championships